In plant biology, Vavilovian mimicry (also crop mimicry or weed mimicry) is a form of mimicry in plants where a weed evolves to share one or more characteristics with a domesticated plant through generations of artificial selection. It is named after Nikolai Vavilov, a prominent Russian plant geneticist. Selection against the weed may occur by killing a young or adult weed, separating its seeds from those of the crop (winnowing), or both. This has been done manually since Neolithic times, and in more recent years by agricultural machinery.

Vavilovian mimicry is a good illustration of unintentional selection by humans. Although the human selective agents might be conscious of their impact on the local weed gene pool, such effects go against the goals of those growing crops. Weeders do not want to select for weeds that are increasingly similar to the cultivated plant, yet the only other option is to let the weeds grow and compete with crops for sunlight and nutrients. Similar situations include antibiotic resistance and, also in agricultural crops, herbicide resistance. Having acquired many desirable qualities by being subjected to similar selective pressures, Vavilovian mimics may eventually be domesticated themselves. Vavilov called these weeds-become-crops secondary crops.

Classification and comparisons

Vavilovian mimicry can be classified as reproductive, aggressive (parasitic) and, in the case of secondary crops, mutualistic. It is a form of disjunct mimicry with the model agreeable to the dupe. In disjunct mimicry complexes, three different species are involved as model, mimic and dupe—the weed, mimicking a protected crop model, with humans as signal receivers. Vavilovian mimicry bears considerable similarity to Batesian mimicry (where a harmless organism mimics a harmful species) in that the weed does not share the properties that give the model its protection, and both the model and the dupe (in this case humans) are negatively affected by it. There are some key differences, though; in Batesian mimicry the model and signal receiver are enemies (the predator would eat the protected species if it could), whereas here the crop and its human growers are in a mutualistic relationship: the crop benefits from being dispersed and protected by people, despite being eaten by them. In fact, the crop's only 'protection' relevant here is its usefulness to humans. Secondly, the weed is not eaten, but simply killed (either directly or by not planting the seed). The only motivation for killing the weed is its effect on crop yields. Farmers would prefer to have no weeds at all, but a predator would die if it had no prey to eat, even if they might be difficult to identify. Finally, there is no known equivalent of Vavilovian mimicry in ecosystems unaltered by humans.

Delbert Wiens has argued that secondary crops cannot be classified as mimics, because they result from artificial as opposed to natural selection, and because the selective agent is a machine. On this first point, Georges Pasteur points out that "indirect artificial selection" is involuntary and thus no different from natural selection. That the signal receiver is an inanimate object certainly deviates from the normal case of a dupe perceiving the signal, but the result is no different from that of manual selection that has been occurring since the Neolithic Revolution.

Examples

One case of Vavilovian mimicry is the gold-of-pleasure or false flax (Camelina sativa linicola), which looks much like the flax plant Linum usitatissimum, and occurs with it in the field. The gold-of-pleasure is a descendant of Camelina gabrata, a wild species; its subspecific name linicola means "the one that lives with flax". Weeding of the adult plant is impractical; instead they are separated based on properties of the seed. This is done by a winnowing machine, which in this case acts as an inanimate signal receiver. Seeds that are thrown the same distance as flax seeds have thus been selected for, making it near impossible to separate the seeds of these two species.

Another example is rye (Secale cereale), a grass which is derived from wild rye (Secale montanum), a widely distributed Mediterranean species. Rye was originally just a weed growing with wheat and barley, but came under similar selective pressures to the crops. Like wheat, it came to have larger seeds and more rigid spindles to which the seeds are attached. However, wheat is an annual plant, while wild rye is a perennial. At the end of each growing season wheat produces seeds, while wild rye does not and is thus destroyed as the post-harvest soil is tilled. However, there are occasional mutants that do set seed. These have been protected from destruction, and rye has thus evolved to become an annual plant.

Rye is a hardier plant than wheat, surviving in harsher conditions. Having become preadapted as a crop through wheat mimicry, rye was then positioned to become a cultivated plant in areas where soil and climatic conditions favored its production, such as mountainous terrain.

This fate is shared by oats (Avena sativa and Avena byzantina), which also tolerate poorer conditions, and like rye, grow as a weed alongside wheat and barley. Derived from a wild species (Avena sterilis), it has thus come to be a crop in its own right. Once again paralleling wheat, rye and other cereals, oats have developed tough spindles which prevent seeds from easily dropping off, and other characteristics which also help in natural dispersal have become vestigial, including the awns which allow them to self bury.

The flax-dodder (Cuscuta epilinum) is a creeper that grows around flax and linseed plants. Much like the other cases, its seeds have become larger. A mutant double-seeded variety has become prevalent, as seed size has once again been the character upon which selection has acted.

Selection can also occur on the vegetative stage, through hand weeding. Weeding often takes place when the crop plant is very young, and most vulnerable. Echinochloa oryzoides, a species of grass which is found as a weed in rice (Oryza sativa) fields, looks similar to rice and its seeds are often mixed in rice and difficult to separate. This close similarity was enhanced by the weeding process which is a selective force that increases the similarity of the weed in each subsequent generation.

See also
Threshing

Notes

References

Sources
 One of the most extensive articles on the topic.
 Discussion of crop mimicry among many other plant cases.
 A significant portion discusses weeds.

Further reading
 
 

Mimicry
History of agriculture